Algiers Point is a location on the Lower Mississippi River in New Orleans, Louisiana.  In river pilotage, Algiers Point is one of the many points of land around which the river flows—albeit a significant one.  Since the 1970s, the name Algiers Point has also referred to the neighborhood in the immediate vicinity of that point. People from Algiers Point (and Algiers as a whole) are known as Algierines, or Algerines.

Navigational point

The course of the Mississippi River past and through New Orleans is in the shape of a crescent.  As the river reaches the downriver end of that crescent, flowing by then in a northerly direction, it makes a sharp "right-hand" turn to the east.  The French Quarter, Faubourg Marigny and Bywater lie on the outside of the bend on the river's left descending bank.  The point of land on the river's right descending bank is, and has historically been, called Algiers Point.

Just off this point is where the Mississippi River is at its deepest, approximately 60 meters (200 ft) deep.  This depth varies from year to year as the river alternately scours and deposits silt.  A U.S. Coast Guard aid to navigation, Algiers Point Light "95," marks the point.  Its geographic coordinates are 

The U.S. Army Corps of Engineers' linear description of the location is mile 94.6 AHP (above Head of Passes) on the Lower Mississippi River.

In the 20th century, the Coast Guard began regulating marine traffic approaching and rounding Algiers Point.  Licensed pilots were enlisted to man a tower atop the Gov. Nicholls Street Wharf across the river from the point, and to communicate with mariners via marine VHF radio and via a red and green traffic light, in order to restrict two-way traffic when high water makes such traffic hazardous.

Neighborhood
This is a brief description of a neighborhood within the larger Algiers section of New Orleans.

The neighborhood near the point described above came to be called Algiers Point beginning in the 1970s. At that time a community movement began to emphasize the historic and aesthetic aspects of the neighborhood's houses and other assets, as contrasted to other sections of Algiers, especially newer, post-World War II residential areas.

The size and boundaries of the neighborhood depend on colloquial or legal context, but a conservative description is the approximately 50 city blocks bounded by Opelousas Avenue, Atlantic Avenue and the river. The Algiers Point National Historic District is bounded on the south by Slidell Avenue instead of Opelousas Avenue. The southern boundary of the city-regulated Algiers Point Historic District, as defined by the New Orleans Historic District Landmarks Commission, is Newton Street.

Some of the houses and other structures in Algiers Point predate the American Civil War, but most were built in the period immediately after a catastrophic 1895 fire which destroyed hundreds of structures in the area.

Numerous small businesses such as bars, restaurants, coffee shops, and professional services are located here, creating a mixed use neighborhood.

Demographics

As of the census of 2000, there were 2,381 people, 1,145 households, and 555 families residing in the neighborhood.

As of the census of 2010, there were 2,455 people, 1,229 households, and 574 families residing in the neighborhood.

Education

Orleans Parish School Board (OPSB) or New Orleans Public Schools (NOPS) operates public schools.  The Adolph Meyer School is an elementary school in the neighborhood which is listed on the National Register of Historic Places, and also known as the Harriet R. Tubman Elementary School.

Public library
New Orleans Public Library (NOPL) operates the Cita Dennis Hubbell Branch in Algiers Point. It occupies the oldest public library building in the city. It opened as the Algiers Branch, a Carnegie library, in 1907 and was the only library in the Algiers area for many years. It was one of five New Orleans Carnegie libraries, and as of 2013, one of two that are still open as libraries.

It was originally closed after the opening of the Algiers Regional Library, but Cita Dennis Hubbell and a group led by her campaigned to have it reopened, citing the long distance from Algiers Point to the new library. In 2005 Hurricane Katrina hit Algiers Point. Hubbell's daughter campaigned for the library to be reopened. It reopened shortly after Katrina, but when officials processed concerns about the structural integrity of the building they decided to close the library. The library closed in 2006, but then had termite damage and structural damage ameliorated with renovations. The branch held a grand re-opening in 2013.

See also
Algiers, New Orleans

References

External links 

 Algiers Point Association
 Algiers Historical Society
 Algiers Point Information and Links page
 Cita Dennis Hubbell Library
 Southern Pacific Historical & Technical Society

Historic districts on the National Register of Historic Places in Louisiana
Mississippi River
Neighborhoods in New Orleans
National Register of Historic Places in New Orleans